In mathematics, or specifically, in differential topology, Ehresmann's lemma or Ehresmann's fibration theorem states that if a smooth mapping , where  and  are smooth manifolds, is
 a surjective submersion, and
 a proper map (in particular, this condition is always satisfied if M is compact),

then it is a locally trivial fibration. This is a foundational result in differential topology due to Charles Ehresmann, and has many variants.

See also 
Thom's first isotopy lemma

References

 

Theorems in differential topology